Södra Sandby is the second largest locality in Lund Municipality, Skåne County, Sweden with 6,136 inhabitants in 2010. It is situated about 10 kilometers east of Lund and 30 kilometers northeast of Malmö.

The Sandbian Age of the Ordovician Period of geological time is named for Södra Sandby where the Lindegård Formation crops out.

References 

Populated places in Lund Municipality
Populated places in Skåne County